From the Land of the Moon (literally "disease of the stones") is a 2016 French film written and directed by Nicole Garcia and starring Marion Cotillard. The film is adapted from the 2006 Italian novella by Milena Agus. The film competed for the Palme d'Or at the 2016 Cannes Film Festival, and received eight nominations for the César Awards, including Best Film, Best Director for Nicole Garcia, and Best Actress for Marion Cotillard.

Plot
At the end of WWII, a woman enters a marriage of convenience to a man who had shown kindness to her family during the war. Sickly from kidney stones, she travels to a fancy clinic for treatment and falls in love with a veteran she meets there. After they part, she considers whether to build a family with the man who loves her or re-kindle the lost bond with the man she loved while briefly away from home.

Cast

 Marion Cotillard as Gabrielle
 Louis Garrel as André Sauvage
 Àlex Brendemühl as José
 Brigitte Roüan as Adèle
 Victoire Du Bois as Jeannine
 Aloïse Sauvage as Agostine
 Daniel Para as Martin
 Jihwan Kim as Blaise
 Victor Quilichini as 14-year-old Marc

Release
In May 2015, StudioCanal acquired distribution rights to the film in United Kingdom, France, Germany and Australia. In March 2016, Sundance Selects acquired U.S distribution rights to the film.

Reception

Critical response
The film was nominated for several awards at the César Awards and elsewhere in Europe, including for Cotillard's performance and the cinematography by Christophe Beaucarne.

American critics were less enthusiastic in their response. On Rotten Tomatoes the film has an approval rating of 32% based on reviews from 56 critics, with an average score of 4.73/10. The website's critics consensus reads: "From the Land of the Moon benefits from striking visuals and strong work from Marion Cotillard, but they're both ultimately overcome by a story that drifts into wan melodrama." On Metacritic the film has a score of 40 out of 100, based on reviews from 17 critics, indicating "mixed or average reviews". Alan Zilberman of the Washington Post said, "Moments of visual beauty only call attention to the stilted dialogue and maudlin plot that otherwise define the film." Sheri Linden of the Los Angeles Times said, "Marion Cotillard shines", but director Garcia's "lush period drama equates hyper-romance with both self-realization and delusion, a proposition that proves more muddled than illuminating."

Box office
In France, From the Land of the Moon was released to 335 screens, where it debuted at number nine at the box office, selling 283,843 tickets. It sold a total of 669,856 tickets and grossed $4,718,885 after 13 weeks in French cinemas. The film grossed a total of $6,547,983 worldwide against a production budget of €10.5 million.

Accolades

References

External links
 
 

2016 films
2016 drama films
French drama films
Films based on Italian novels
Films set in the 1950s
Films directed by Nicole Garcia
Films scored by Daniel Pemberton
IFC Films films
2010s French films
2010s French-language films